Isaivani (born 1996) is a gaana singer from Chennai, who performs with The Casteless Collective. In 2020 she was recognised for her achievements with one of the BBC 100 Women Awards.

Biography 
Isaivani was born in Royapuram in Chennai in 1996 to Sivakumar D and Selvi. Her father, a self-taught keyboardist, encouraged her musical ability and singing from a young age, encouraging Selvi to sing to Isaivani and her brother while they were in the womb. Her performance career began at the age of six, alongside her father and by 2018 she had performed approximately 10,000 shows with him. She began sing Tamil film songs and to cover gaana songs as a teenager because audiences responded well to them. In 2017, gaana musician Sabesh Solomon contacted her and encouraged her to audition for a new band that was being formed by Tenma - this band became The Casteless Collective.

By joining the band, Isaivani became one of the first professional female gaana singers in the world. In addition she is a woman from a low caste, succeeding in a male, high-caste dominated genre of music, despite initial opposition from people who felt that gaana should be preserved as male-only artform. The music she sings with The Casteless Collective is political: in 2018 they released 'Beef Song' in protest at the lynching of dalit people; in 2019 they released 'I’m Sorry Ayyappa' about the Sabarimala temple controversy. Her presence on stage has led to other women coming forward as gaana performers.

In 2020, Isaivani was recognised for her contributions to gaana music with a BBC 100 Women Award. She participated in Tamil Bigg Boss Season 5.

Television

References 

21st-century Indian women singers
21st-century Indian singers
People from Chennai
1996 births
Living people
BBC 100 Women
Bigg Boss (Tamil TV series) contestants